Karel Vítězslav Mašek (1 September 1865, Prague - 24 July 1927, Prague) was a Czech painter, architect, illustrator and art professor.

Life 
He studied briefly at the Academy of Fine Arts, Prague with Antonín Lhota then, in 1884, transferred to the Academy of Fine Arts, Munich where he was a member of "Škréta" (Orcs), a Czech young artists' association, and studied with Alexander von Wagner.

In 1887, he accompanied Alfons Mucha and František Dvořák to Paris, studying at the Académie Julian with Gustave Boulanger and Jules Lefebvre. It was there that he became acquainted with pointillism. he returned to Prague in 1888 and two years later joined the "", or "Kunstverein für Böhmen" (Fine Arts Unit), an association which included many members of the Czech nobility who were devoted to the promotion of art.

From 1898, he was a professor at the Academy of Arts, Architecture and Design in Prague. Josef Čapek is, perhaps, his best-known student. He was also interested in architecture and designed his own villa in 1901. In his later years, he was involved in engineering issues related to the growth of Prague and its agglomeration with neighboring towns.

References

Further reading 
  Karolína Fabelová, Karel Vítězslav Mašek, Eminent - Patrik Šimon (2002) 
 Marie Rakušanová, Bytosti odnikud : metamorfózy akademických principů v malbě první poloviny 20. století v Čechách (Beings from Nowhere: the Metamorphosis of Academic Principles in the Painting of the First Half of the 20th Century in Bohemia), Academia (2008) 
 Jiří Valenta, Malované opony divadel českých zemí (Painted Theater Curtains, including those by Mašek), NIPOS (2010),

External links 

 ArtNet: More works by Mašek
 AAAD website, Prague: Chronology and critical analysis of Mašek
 List of Works relating to Mašek in the National Library of the Czech Republic  
 Informační systém abART: Mašek Karel Vítězslav

Czech painters
Czech male painters
1927 deaths
1865 births
Art Nouveau painters
Academic staff of the Academy of Arts, Architecture and Design in Prague